Ursula Brauch (born 18 October 1962) is a German rower. She competed in the women's single sculls event at the 1984 Summer Olympics.

References

1962 births
Living people
German female rowers
Olympic rowers of West Germany
Rowers at the 1984 Summer Olympics
Sportspeople from Karlsruhe